Cucurbitin is an amino acid and a carboxypyrrolidine that is found in Cucurbita seeds.  Cucurbitin causes degenerative changes in the reproductive organs of parasitic flatworms called flukes.

References 

Amino acids
Pyrrolidines
Plant toxins